Xerocrassa penchinati is a species of air-breathing land snail, a pulmonate gastropod mollusk in the family Geomitridae.

Distribution

This species is native to Spain, Andorra and France.

References

 Bank, R. A.; Neubert, E. (2017). Checklist of the land and freshwater Gastropoda of Europe. Last update: July 16th, 2017

External links
 Bourguignat, J.-R. (1863-1868). Mollusques nouveaux, litigieux ou peu connus. Tome 1 (= "Première centurie (Mars 1863 à Décembre 1868)") 324 pp., pls 1-45 (1863-1868)
 Fagot, P. (1884-1886). Contribution a la faune malacologique de la Catalogne. Annales de Malacologie. 2 (1/2): 169-192; 2 (3): 193-194. Paris.

penchinati
Molluscs of Europe
Gastropods described in 1868